The 2021 Tour of the Alps was the 44th edition of the Tour of the Alps road cycling stage race and the fifth edition since its renaming from the Giro del Trentino. It was held from 19 to 23 April 2021 in the Austrian state of Tyrol and in the Italian provinces of Trentino and South Tyrol, which all make up the Euroregion of Tyrol–South Tyrol–Trentino. The 2.Pro-category race was initially scheduled to be a part of the inaugural edition of the UCI ProSeries, but after the 2020 edition was cancelled due to the COVID-19 pandemic, it made its UCI ProSeries debut in 2021, while also still being a part of the 2021 UCI Europe Tour.

Teams 
Thirteen of the nineteen UCI WorldTeams, seven UCI ProTeams, and one UCI Continental team made up the twenty-one teams that participated in the race. UCI ProTeam  was originally invited to participate, but they imposed a self-suspension on racing after one of their riders received a positive anti-doping test. Teams were allowed to field up a maximum of seven riders each, but four teams (and ) each decided to only field six, for a total of 143 riders. Of this number, there were 116 finishers.

UCI WorldTeams

 
 
 
 
 
 
 
 
 
 
 
 
 

UCI ProTeams

 
 
 
 
 
 
 
 

UCI Continental Teams

Route 
The race began in Brixen in South Tyrol, Italy and traveled north to cross the border into Tyrol, Austria for the remainder of stage 1 and the entirety of stage 2. On stage 3, the race once again crossed the border to head back down south into South Tyrol. Stage 4 saw the race continue to head south into Trentino, where the race finished in Riva del Garda on stage 5.

Stages

Stage 1 
19 April 2021 — Brixen/Bressanone to Innsbruck,

Stage 2 
20 April 2021 — Innsbruck to Feichten im Kaunertal,

Stage 3 
21 April 2021 — Imst to Naturns/Naturno,

Stage 4 
22 April 2021 — Naturns/Naturno to Valle del Chiese (Pieve di Bono),

Stage 5 
23 April 2021 — Valle del Chiese (Idroland) to Riva del Garda,

Classification leadership table 
In the 2021 Tour of the Alps, there were five classifications, of which four had jerseys awarded to the leaders and winners; the colors of each jersey were derived from the company that sponsored each jersey. The general classification (GC) ultimately decided which rider won the overall race, and was calculated by adding up each rider's finishing time on each stage and deducting any bonus seconds accrued. For each stage, the top three finishers got ten, six, and four bonus seconds, respectively, taken off their GC time. The rider with the fastest time after each stage and at the end of the race wore the yellow jersey, sponsored by Italian apple-producing consortium Melinda.

The second classification was the mountains classification. Points were accumulated by being one of the first riders to summit certain climbs, which were marked as either third, second, and first-category climbs, in order of increasing difficulty. Each of the five stages had two designated climbs with points on offer; of these ten climbs, three were first-category, five were second-category, and two were third-category, for a maximum of 66 points that could be obtained by any one rider. The rider who accumulated the most mountains classification points after each stage and at the end of the race wore the light blue jersey, sponsored by Italian bank Gruppo Cassa Centrale.

The young rider classification was based on and calculated the same way as the general classification, although only under-23 riders, born on or after 1 January 1998, were eligible to contest this ranking. The highest placed under-23 rider in the GC after each stage and at the end of the race wore the white jersey, sponsored by the Austrian branch of the safety and workwear clothing manufacturer Würth Modyf.

The other points-based classification was the sprints classification. Each of the five stages featured one intermediate sprint, which offered six, four, and two points, respectively, to the first three riders to cross the sprint line, for a maximum of 30 points that could be obtained by any one rider. The rider who accumulated the most sprints classification points after each stage and at the end of the race wore the red jersey, sponsored by Italian sports news company PMG Sport.

The fifth and last classification was the team classification. For this classification, the times of the first three finishers for each team were added together, and the leading team after each stage and at the end of the race was the team with the lowest cumulative time. No special jerseys or jersey numbers were awarded to the leaders and winners of this classification.

 On stage 3, Alessandro De Marchi, who was second in the mountains classification, wore the light blue jersey, because first-placed Simon Yates wore the green jersey as the leader of the general classification.

Final classification standings

General classification

Mountains classification

Young rider classification

Sprints classification

Team classification

References

Sources

External links 
 

2021
Tour of the Alps
Tour of the Alps
Tour of the Alps
Tour of the Alps
Tour of the Alps
Tour of the Alps